Marvin Daniel LaRose (February 8, 1939 – April 27, 2019) was an American college and professional football player who played five seasons in the National Football League (NFL). He played college football for the University of Missouri, where he earned unanimous All-American honors.  He was drafted by the Detroit Lions in the second round of the 1961 NFL Draft, and also by the Boston Patriots in the third round of the 1961 AFL Draft.

Early years
LaRose was born in Crystal City, Missouri.  He attended Crystal City High School, where he played high school football for the Crystal City Hornets.

College career
While attending the University of Missouri in Columbia, Missouri, LaRose played for coach Dan Devine's Missouri Tigers football team from 1958 to 1960.  He led the team in receiving yardage as a sophomore and again as a senior, and was a first-team all-conference selection after those seasons.  He was a key member of the 1960 Tigers team that posted an undefeated 11–0 record, claimed the Big Eight Conference championship, won the 1961 Orange Bowl, and finished No. 4 in the Coaches Poll.  Following his senior season in 1960, LaRose was recognized as a unanimous first-team All-American at the end position, having been a first-team selection of the Associated Press (AP), the American Football Coaches Association (AFCA), the Football Writers Association of America (FWAA), Newspaper Enterprise Association (NEA), The Sporting News, United Press International (UPI), Central Press Association (CPA), Time magazine, and the Walter Camp Football Foundation.  He was inducted into the University of Missouri Intercollegiate Athletics Hall of Fame in 1992.

Professional career
He was also a member of the Pittsburgh Steelers, San Francisco 49ers and Denver Broncos. In six professional seasons, LaRose played in 65 regular season games.

See also
 Missouri Tigers
 List of University of Missouri alumni

References

2019 deaths
1939 births
Players of American football from Missouri
American football offensive linemen
American football defensive ends
Missouri Tigers football players
Detroit Lions players
Pittsburgh Steelers players
San Francisco 49ers players
Denver Broncos (AFL) players
All-American college football players
People from Crystal City, Missouri